Arancibia is a surname of Basque origins. Spelling variations include Arencibia or Aranzubia. Notable people with the surname include:

Alex Arancibia (born 1990), Bolivian football player
Daniel Aranzubia (born 1979), Spanish football player
David Padilla Arancibia (born 1927), Bolivian general and president
Eduardo Arancibia (born 1976), Chilean football player
Ernesto Arancibia (1904–1963), Argentine film director
Francisco Arancibia (born 1996), Chilean football player
J. P. Arencibia (born 1986), American baseball player

See also
Basque surnames

Basque-language surnames